Moshe Sharoni (1929 – 20 September 2020) was an Israeli politician who served as a member of the Knesset for Gil between 2006 and 2009. He previously served as head of the breakaway faction, Justice for the Elderly.

Biography
Born in Buhuși in Romania in 1929, Sharoni immigrated to Israel in 1948. In 1987 he gained a BA in municipal management from the University of Haifa.

Prior to the 1996 elections he and Nava Arad helped establish the Pensioner's Party, which later became Gil. He was second on the party's list for the 1999 elections, but the party failed to win a seat. In 2006 he was elected to the Knesset on the Gil list. However, in early 2008 he led a breakaway faction from the party, establishing Justice for the Elderly on 2 June 2008.

On 27 October 2008 the faction merged back into Gil. He lost his seat in the 2009 elections when the party failed to cross the electoral threshold.

References

External links

1929 births
Romanian Jews
People from Buhuși
University of Haifa alumni
Members of the 17th Knesset (2006–2009)
Leaders of political parties in Israel
2020 deaths
Justice for the Elderly politicians
Dor (political party) politicians
Romanian emigrants to Israel
People from Haifa